Hans Jansen (1942–2015) was a Dutch politician, scholar of contemporary Islam and author.

Hans Jansen may also refer to:
Hans Jansen (composer)
Hans Martens, sometimes given the name Hans Jansen, father of Dutch spectacle-maker Zacharias Jansen

See also
Johannes Jansen (disambiguation) (Hans is often short for Johannes)
Hans Janssen